Karojba is a village and municipality in Istria, Croatia located 18 km north-west of Pazin. The population is 1,438 (2011).

References

External links
Karojba official website
Karojba Tourist Board

Municipalities of Croatia
Populated places in Istria County